Arbab Muhammad Wasim Khan is a Pakistani politician hailing from Peshawar, who had been a member of the Khyber Pakhtunkhwa Assembly from May 2016 to May 2018 and from August 2018 to January 2023.

Political career
Arbab waseem hayat was elected as the member of the Khyber Pakhtunkhwa Assembly on the ticket of Pakistan Muslim League (N) from PK-8 (Peshawar-VIII) in by-polls held in May 2016 following the vacancy caused by the death of his uncle and father in law Arbab Akbar Hayat.

He contested the 2018 provincial election on the ticket of Pakistan Tehreek-e-Insaf and won PK-67 (Peshawar-II).

References

Living people
Pashtun people
Khyber Pakhtunkhwa MPAs 2013–2018
People from Peshawar
Pakistan Muslim League (N) politicians
Pakistan Tehreek-e-Insaf MPAs (Khyber Pakhtunkhwa)
Year of birth missing (living people)